Population Matters, formerly known as the Optimum Population Trust, is a UK-based charity that addresses population size and its effects on environmental sustainability. It considers population growth as a major contributor to environmental degradation, biodiversity loss, resource depletion and climate change. The group promotes ethical, choice-based solutions through lobbying, campaigning and awareness-raising.

History and background
Population Matters was launched as the Optimum Population Trust following a meeting on 24 July 1991 by the late David Willey and others concerned about population numbers and sustainability. They were impelled to act by the failure of United Kingdom governments to respond to population growth and threats to sustainability.

The Optimum Population Trust prepared analyses and lobbied on issues affected by population growth. It was granted charitable status on 9 May 2006. Population Matters was adopted as its new name in 2011.

Views and aims 
Population Matters highlights how rapid human population growth has fueled the destruction of nature and natural resource depletion. The charity promotes positive, voluntary measures to achieve a sustainable human population size that enables everyone to have a decent quality of life while safeguarding our natural environment.

The United Nations projects that global population size will reach 9.7 billion in the year 2050 and 10.9 in 2100, which illustrates the urgency of the matter, according to the organisation.

Vision 
Population Matters' vision is of a future in which our population co-exists in harmony with nature and prospers on a healthy planet, to the benefit of all.

Mission
Population Matters' mission is to drive positive, large-scale action through fostering choices that help achieve a sustainable human population and regenerate our environment.

Solutions 
Population Matters promotes five solutions to slow and ultimately reverse population growth:

 Achieve global gender equality
 Remove all barriers to modern family planning
 Quality education for all
 Global justice and sustainable economies
 Promote small family size

In addition, recognising the disproportionately large environmental footprint of wealthy nations, the charity calls for reducing consumption in high-income countries.

Activities 
Population Matters campaigns to stabilise population at a sustainable level through encouraging a culture shift towards smaller family sizes worldwide ("Pledge two or fewer") and improving funding for women's empowerment and family planning in lower income countries. Over the years, the organisation has run various campaigns, including supporting Caroline Lucas' Bill to make Personal, Social, Health and Economic education (PSHE) a statutory requirement in state-funded schools. Current campaign and lobbying activity focuses on biodiversity loss and challenging economic concerns regarding birth rate decline. It also informs the public on overpopulation and positive solutions through its communications, events and outreach activities. Finally, the charity undertakes and commissions research to examine some issues in depth, for example, publishing a report on the rise of coercive pronatalism, or exploring the feasibility of lower future population scenarios.

Population Matters publishes the editorially independent Journal of Population and Sustainability, an open access, peer-reviewed, interdisciplinary journal exploring all aspects of the relationship between human numbers and environmental issues.

The charity runs Empower to Plan, a crowdfunding programme that offers members of the public the opportunity to donate directly towards family planning and women's empowerment projects around the world. This project superseded the carbon offsetting project called PopOffsets.

Population Matters is a member of the International Union for Conservation of Nature (IUCN), has consultative status at the United Nations Economic and Social Council (ECOSOC), and is a member of the Wellbeing Economy Alliance.

Organisational structure 
Population Matters consists of an operational team of staff and a board of trustees, who oversee the work and strategy. An Expert Advisory Group provides guidance on key issues and the organisation's patrons provide endorsement and support.

Patrons 
Population Matters' patrons are prominent public figures who are outspoken about the impacts of human population growth, including Sir David Attenborough, Chris Packham, Dr. Jane Goodall, Leilani Münter, Jonathon Porritt, Sir Partha Dasgupta, Professor Paul Ehrlich, and Professor John Guillebaud.

Immigration 
In 2015, Population Matters published a blog post disagreeing with an Amnesty International call on the UK and other EU countries to "significantly increase the number of resettlement and humanitarian admission places for refugees from Syria" while saying that these "countries should continue to support migrants from the Syrian civil war and other conflicts in the countries adjacent to those conflicts". The organization subsequently confirmed that this had never been official Population Matters policy and had been repudiated and withdrawn. The Optimum Population Trust had called for numerically balanced or "zero-net" migration to the UK, but did not continue to support this policy as Population Matters. In 2015, Population Matters advocated stopping child benefit and tax credits for third and subsequent children. In 2017, the organization stopped advocating for specific policy changes, replacing them with a call for a Sustainable Population Policy.

See also

Overconsumption (economics)
Population density
Zero population growth

References

External links 
 Official website

Organizations established in 1991
1991 establishments in the United Kingdom
Advocates of women's reproductive rights
Charities based in England
Nature conservation organisations based in the United Kingdom
Human overpopulation think tanks
Political advocacy groups in England
Political and economic think tanks based in the United Kingdom
Population concern advocacy groups
Population research organizations
Environmental charities based in the United Kingdom